The second election to Western Isles Council was held on 8 May 1978 as part of the wider 1978 Scottish regional elections. All candidates stood as Independents, and 23 candidates were elected unopposed.

Aggregate results

Ward results

References

1978 Scottish local elections
1978